Beaver River sandstone is a rock material locally found in northern Alberta, Canada, that was extensively used by First Nations people in prehistoric times to make tools with a sharp edge.  

Many projectile points and other tools made from the Beaver River sandstone have been found at archaeological sites in the Oil Sands region of Alberta. The source of this material has been identified as a site on the east side of the Muskeg River where native peoples quarried rock for use in making tools.

References

Sandstone in Canada
Geology of Alberta
Archaeology of Canada